Shreen Abdul Saroor (b. 1969) is a Sri Lankan peace and women's rights activist. In 1990 as part of the Muslim minority in Sri Lanka, she was forcibly removed from her home in Mannar by the Liberation Tigers of Tamil Eelam and placed in a refugee camp. After experiencing the tragedies of the Sri Lankan Civil War, Saroor was moved to work for peace and women's rights. In 1999, she founded the Mannar Women's Development Federation to help promote women's empowerment. In 2004 she was included in the documentary film Leading the Way to Peace, Women Peacemakers. In 2008 Shreen was awarded the Voices of Courage award by the International Rescue Committee's Women's Refugee Commission for her advocacy for internally displaced women. In 2011 she was recipient of the N-Peace Award. In 2017, Shreen received the Franco-German Prize for Human Rights and the Rule of Law. The same year she became an Ashoka Fellow.

Saroor works toward a united Sri Lankan women's movement under the umbrella organization, the Women's Action Network (WAN). Saroor's work as an author includes her contributions to the Colombo Telegraph.

References

External links
 The story of Shreen Saroor YouTube video

Living people
1969 births
20th-century Sri Lankan women
21st-century Sri Lankan women
Sri Lankan women activists
Ashoka India Fellows